Christian Ostberg (born 19 July 1994) is an American rugby union player, currently playing for the Austin Gilgronis of Major League Rugby (MLR). His preferred position is lock.

Professional career
Ostberg signed for Major League Rugby side Austin Gilgronis ahead of the 2021 Major League Rugby season. He had previously spent four seasons at Pro D2 side .

References

External links
itsrugby.co.uk Profile

1995 births
Living people
American rugby union players
Rugby union locks
Stade Aurillacois Cantal Auvergne players
Austin Gilgronis players
Rugby union flankers
American Raptors players